Collingwood School is an independent, non-denominational, co-educational, university-preparatory school founded in 1984. Located in West Vancouver, British Columbia, Canada, it delivers the British Columbia Ministry of Education curriculum from Junior Kindergarten to Grade 12.

Facilities

Morven Campus

The Morven campus is the oldest of Collingwood School. It is located at 70 Morven Drive in the British Properties residential area of West Vancouver, and houses Grades 8 and 9 of the Middle School and Grades 10-12 of the Senior School. The buildings previously made up Glenmore Elementary School, which was closed in 1982 along with several other schools in West Vancouver. Parents, students and teachers protested the closure of Glenmore, but were unsuccessful in keeping the school open in the face of declining enrollment and a reduced education budget.

The campus has since seen several expansions and improvements, including a full redevelopment completed in 2014. The redevelopment included a theatre, a dance studio, band and choir facilities, a library, a gymnasium, weight facilities and an athletics field, cafeteria, and 21st century learning spaces, all located around an open student commons. Morven is adjacent to Glenmore Park.

Wentworth Campus

Opened in 1997, the junior campus – also known as the "Wentworth" campus – is located at 2605 Wentworth Avenue, in the Cypress area of West Vancouver. It is located in proximity to Cypress Provincial Park. This campus houses all students in the Junior School, which ranges from Junior Kindergarten to Grade 5, and the first two years of Middle School (grades 6 and 7). The school consists of two wings, the Junior Kindergarten-Grade 5 Wing and the Grades 6 and 7 Wing. The Grade 6 and 7 Wing features a full-sized gymnasium and well as two science laboratories.

Curriculum 
Collingwood School delivers the British Columbia Ministry of Education Kindergarten to Grade 12 curriculum. In addition to the Ministry of Education requirements, Collingwood also requires that students partake in the Collingwood Certificate program (and the Four Strands approach) and offers multiple Advanced Placement courses.

Four Strands 

Collingwood emphasizes a concept known as the Four Strands. The Four Strands are Academics, Athletics, Service, and the Arts. All students must participate in the Four Strands and many extracurricular activities are offered to fulfill the requirements. Students are recognized with awards if they excel in any of the four categories.

Collingwood Certificate 

The Collingwood Certificate program is a set of higher standards in addition to the BC Ministry of Education's requirements. The Collingwood Certificate program accompanies the Four Strands approach at Collingwood School. The Collingwood Certificate challenges students with respect to their academic achievement, compulsory athletic participation, continued arts enrollment, participation in community service, the graduation portfolio, and overall citizenship at the school. Upon graduation, the Collingwood Certificate diploma is awarded to all those that meet the requirements.

Debating & Public Speaking 

Collingwood's debating and public speaking program has won many provincial, national and international tournaments. The program's alumni include  World Individual Debating and Public Speaking Championships champion Sarah Mortazavi (Grad '05) and two-time champion, Shakir Rahim (Grad '07). Additionally, each student (from Grade 1 to Grade 12) is required to write and present a persuasive speech, a humorous speech, or a dramatic monologue each year in the school's annual public speaking competition. The Morven campus has a Model United Nations club which attends multiple conferences in the Lower Mainland. In recent years they have travelled to Washington, D.C. and New York.

Round Square

Collingwood is a member of the international Round Square network of schools, which seeks to give every student a variety of academic, physical, cultural and spiritual experiences to enhance their global outlook. 

Collingwood annually sends students across the globe on Round Square International Service trips, to destinations such as India, Belize, and Thailand. Projects have included constructing homes, schools, and fresh water collection systems for communities. There is also involvement in local service initiatives, such as Habitat for Humanity.  Every year, Collingwood sends a delegation of both staff and students to the International Round Square Conference.

In October 2008, Collingwood School co-hosted the international senior Round Square conference with Glenlyon Norfolk School. Delegates from every Round Square school were billeted with Collingwood families. The theme of the conference was "Creating Sustainable Communities – Local to Global".

Athletics

Collingwood has won eight AA rugby, one AA soccer, and one AA basketball provincial titles.

Sports

 Field hockey
 Volleyball
 Cross country
 Swimming
 Soccer
 Basketball
 Skiing/Snowboarding
 Wrestling
 Badminton
 Cricket
 Golf
 Mountain biking
 Rugby
 Tennis
 Track and field

Headmasters 

David Mackenzie: David Mackenzie was Collingwood School's first headmaster. A former member of the British Navy and an avid rugby fan, he also re-founded Brentwood College on Vancouver Island.
Graham Baldwin: Graham Baldwin was Collingwood's Head during its formative years. During his tenure, the school population grew from 200 to 1000 students, and was separated into two campuses.
Jim Burnett: Jim Burnett was appointed acting Head following the departure of Graham Baldwin and eventually received the position. He was previously a member of the US Olympic track & field team.
Rodger Wright: Rodger Wright was Head of Collingwood School between 2004 and 2016. He was previously Head of Trinity College School in Port Hope, Ontario.
Rob Lake: Rob Lake was the Head of Collingwood School from July 2016 to February 2018. He previously served as the Head of Head-Royce School in Oakland, California.
Lisa Evans: Lisa Evans is the current acting Head of Collingwood School, following the departure of Rob Lake in February 2018.

Notable Alumni 
 Valerie Teicher (Tei Shi), singer, songwriter, and record producer
 Alexander Ludwig, actor, singer and model
 Pasha Eshghi, filmmaker
 Mackenzie Davis, actress
Ryan Wang, pianist
Sam Reinhart, professional hockey player
Alexander Kerfoot, professional hockey player
Emily Overholt, professional Canadian swimmer

References

External links
Collingwood School Official Site
Round Square Official Site

Educational institutions established in 1984
High schools in British Columbia
Preparatory schools in British Columbia
Private schools in British Columbia
Round Square schools
West Vancouver
1984 establishments in British Columbia